Kristina Mladenovic and Ivan Dodig defeated Jaimee Fourlis and Jason Kubler in the final, 6–3, 6–4 to win the mixed doubles tennis title at the 2022 Australian Open. Though it was their first major title as a team, the win earned Mladenovic her third Mixed doubles title and Dodig his fourth.

Barbora Krejčíková and Rajeev Ram were the defending champions, but the three-time defending champion Krejčíková chose not to defend her title. Ram partnered alongside Sania Mirza, but they lost to Fourlis and Kubler in the quarterfinals.

Desirae Krawczyk was attempting to complete the first non-calendar-year Grand Slam in Mixed doubles since Billie Jean King in 1968 and would be the first in the Open Era, having won the French Open, Wimbledon and the US Open in 2021. However, she and her partner Joe Salisbury lost in the first round to Giuliana Olmos and Marcelo Arévalo.

Seeds

Draw

Finals

Top half

Bottom half

Other entry information

Wild cards

Alternate pairs

Withdrawals
Before the tournament
  Belinda Bencic /  Filip Polášek → replaced by  Aleksandra Krunić /  Nikola Ćaćić
  Caty McNally /  Jamie Murray → replaced by  Makoto Ninomiya /  Aisam-ul-Haq Qureshi

References

External links 

2022
2022 WTA Tour
2022 ATP Tour
Mixed Doubles